Luis Fernando Galarreta Velarde (born 12 March 1971) is a Peruvian Fujimorist politician and a former Congressman representing Lima between 2006 and 2020. He was President of the Congress for the 2017–2018 annual term. Galarreta was part of the presidential ticket of Keiko Fujimori in the 2021 elections that lost the elections to the Pedro Castillo ticket, however, he was elected to the Andean Parliament.

Early life and education 
Luis Fernando Galarreta Velarde was born on 12 March 1971 in Lima. Son of Aníbal Galarreta, a native of the La Libertad region and Rita Velarde from Lima. According to him, he told the Extraordinary program in 2013, his mother took the pill Thalidomide, which was used to relieve nausea in pregnant women. Currently, the drug is prohibited from being marketed because it was found to cause abnormalities in the extremities of fetuses.

He completed his primary and secondary school studies at the James Monroe School in the city of Lima, also attended the National Rehabilitation Institute of Callao where he learned the use of his prostheses.

He studied Law and Political Science at the University of San Martín de Porres (1990 - 1997), obtaining a bachelor's degree. He has a specialization in Banking and Finance at the San Ignacio de Loyola Higher Educational Institution (1993 - 1995).

He has been in charge of the administration of various social projects. In the Asociación Civil Pro Educación he was responsible for the “TIP's” program aimed at street children in the city of Lima. He is the Executive President of the Asociación Civil Pro Deber, which he formed with a group of colleagues from the university. Pro Deber is aimed at promoting citizen duties and strengthening the political and economic principles of a culture of freedom.

Political career

Early political career 
From 1997 on he was committed to the NPO "Pro Education" of the conservative National Renewal (RN) party leader Rafael Rey Rey. He also joined Rey's party at the same time, the RN. In 1999 he represented the National Council for the Integration of Persons with Disability adjunct to the Labour Ministry. In 2002, he was elected councillor of Lima for a four-year term under the National Unity (UN) alliance in which Luis Castañeda was elected Mayor of Lima.

Congressman 
In the 2006 election, he was elected to Congress for the 2006–2011 term for the same group. When the UN broke in 2008, Galarreta decided to stay on the National Unity bench, now congruent with the Christian People's Party (PPC). Consequently, he left the RN and later he was a member of the Political Commission of the PPC. In the 2011 election, he was re-elected for another five-year term on the ticket of the Alliance for the Great Change, to which the Christian democrats now belong. He was Third Vice President of the Congress during the 2015-2016 annual term under the leadership of Luis Iberico. Five years later in the 2016 election, he was re-elected for the  2016–2021 term this time, on the ticket of the Fujimorist Popular Force of Keiko Fujimori however, his term was cut short following to the dissolution of the Congress by President Martín Vizcarra in 2019 and served as a member of the Permanent Assembly until 16 March 2020, the date when the new Congress was sworn in. He was the President of the Congress for the 2017-2018 annual term. His election as President of the Congress generated controversy since it would make him the first President of Congress with a disability. He briefly served as the President of Peru in 2018, following the resignation of Pedro Pablo Kuczynski. He left the Christian People's Party in 2015 and joined the Fujimorist Popular Force.

Post-congressional term and 2021 election campaign 
On 30 October 2020, Keiko Fujimori, announced through her Twitter account that she made her presidential candidacy official in internal elections in view of the elections of the following year together with Galarreta for the first vice presidency and the former Lima Lieutenant Mayor Patricia Juárez Gallegos for the second vice presidency being the formula chosen in December by the votes of 37 party delegates as it was the only list and after this the campaign began. At the same time, he ran for a seat in the Andean Parliament, heading the list of his party after the referendum on the reform of the Constitution of Peru in 2018 proposed by then-President Martín Vizcarra approved through popular consultation the prohibition of immediate reelection of parliamentarians to the Congress of Peru. The ticket was defeated by the Castillo led-ticket of Free Peru. However, he was elected to the Andean Parliament.

Personal life 
On 1 April 2021, Keiko Fujimori announced in her Twitter that Galarreta tested positive for COVID-19.

References

External links

Lucho Galarreta's personal site
Official Congressional Site
Resume on the National Electoral Committee (JNE) site

Living people
1971 births
National Unity (Peru) politicians
National Renewal (Peru) politicians
Christian People's Party (Peru) politicians
Fujimorista politicians
Politicians with disabilities
Presidents of the Congress of the Republic of Peru
Members of the Congress of the Republic of Peru
Peruvian people with disabilities
People from Lima